Wednesbury Rugby Club is a rugby union club based in Wednesbury, West Midlands, England. It was founded in 1921 and is the home of the world's tallest rugby posts.

The posts surpassed the previous tallest of 110 ft 1/2 in (33.54 m) that can be found at the Roan Antelope club in Zambia, Africa.

The club currently stands in the Midlands 4 North West League and regularly runs out two teams on a weekly basis, A 1st XV playing the league and cup matches and a Development (2nd XV) Team playing the in Merit League. Wednesbury Rugby Club have also in the past 12 months (2019-2020) relaunched their youth and mini teams, gaining over 50 new youth and mini players in preparation to join the leagues and play competitive rugby at all age groups.

Club Honours
Staffordshire 2 champions: 1990–91
Staffordshire 1 champions (2): 1997–98, 2000–01
Midlands 4 West (North) champions: 2003–04
Staffordshire Owen Cup winners: 2017

See also
Midlands RFU
Staffordshire RU

References

External links
 Wednesbury Rugby Club

English rugby union teams
Rugby clubs established in 1921
1921 establishments in England